College of Technological Sciences – Cebu (CTS-C or better known simply as CTS) is a mid-sized educational institution currently located at Corner R.R. Rallos Street and N. Bacalso Avenue, Cebu City, Philippines. It is the sister school of University of Cebu.

History
The year 1950 marked the founding of the College of Technological Sciences, Inc. (formerly Cebu Technical School).The founder and the first president was Engineer Jovencio Bigornia, It was originally housed at Doña Amparo Building at Corner Sanciangko & Junquera Sts., Cebu City.

Initially CTS offered the following courses:
1 Year - Commercial Radiotelephone Operator
2 Years - Commercial Radiotelegraph Operator
2 Years - Radio Technician
1 Year - Radio Mechanic
1 Year - Auto Mechanic (Including Diesel Mechanic)

On March 18, 1958, the School was officially organized as a stock corporation pursuant to SEC Registration No. 16461. The founders committed themselves “to organize, establish, maintain, and conduct a progressive institution of learning of high academic standing which will emphasize vocational and technical knowledge.”

In 1969, CTS offered the following additional courses:
1 Year - Refrigeration & Air-condition Mechanic
1 Year - Applied/Practical Electricity

Curricula of courses offered were reviewed and redirected to make them relevant and responsive to the needs of industry. In 1973, courses offered were recognized by the Bureau of Private Schools.

In 1976, pursuant to Department Order No. 23, the two-year General Radio Communication Operator course was offered to meet the international standard for overseas employment, to which the Philippines was committed under the Geneva Convention.

In 1977, the Ministry of Education, Culture and Sports approved CTS application to offer a five-year course leading to the degree of Bachelor of Science in Electronics and Communications Engineering (BSECE).

In 1978, in answer to domestic and international shipping needs, CTS obtained approval to operate the following additional courses:
2 Years - Marine Electronic Technician
2 Years - Marine Electrical Technician
2 Years - Marine Refrigeration Technician

Through the difficult years, the school has never lost sight of its mandate to mold young Filipinos in the field of sciences and technology. Its graduates has brought honors to their Alma Mater by topping government board exams. CTS has produced successful graduates who are now employed in the various sectors of economy, holding responsible positions in firms both public and private. Others have gone abroad earning foreign exchange for the country. Many more shall follow in their footsteps.

In June 2004 the school decided to open a new course which is Bachelor of Science In Nursing they utilize the fourth floor building as the office, faculty, classrooms and Simulation room.

The College of Nursing open up with 38 full-time students under the nurture of Dr. Lucita B. Galarpe as the first Dean of the college of Nursing together with her was Mrs. Cecilia P. Mañalac as Associate dean of the college and Mrs. Nerenita Y. Lim as Level I adviser.

Last June 2 and 3 2008 the first batch of the college of nursing had their first attempt in the Nursing Licensure Examination and Successfully the School got 80% passing rate from National 40% Passing Percentage.until now the college of Nursing continue transforming aspiring Nursing students to become Globally Competitive Nurses in the future.

The school also offers Senior High School.

Today, CTS looks beyond the confines of its four walls. It has linkages with the leaders in education technology. Likewise, CTS has developed linkages with industry to conform its courses to the demands of industry.

Philosophy and Objectives
The College of Technological Sciences–Cebu (CTS) as a technological institution aims to organize, establish, maintain and conduct a progressive institution of learning of a high academic standing which will emphasize vocational and technical knowledge and, to this end operate vocational and technical courses in accordance with up-to-date vocational and technical method of educational training.

CTS has become one of the leaders, and should maintain being on top, in technical and vocational education in the country producing quality skilled mechanics, technicians, and engineering graduates who have successfully topped and passed the National Telecommunications Commission (NTC) examinations for radio operators, and Professional Regulation Commission (PRC) examinations for master electricians, electronics and communication engineers. These workers work abroad or in the Philippines as civil servants and entrepreneurs.

Academic programs

Commission on Higher Education (CHED) Accredited Programs
BSN (Bachelor of Science in Nursing)
ASN (Associate Science in Nursing)
CPN (Certified Practical Nursing leading to Licensed Practical Nurse)
BSECE (Bachelor of Science in Electronics and Communication Engineering)
BSIT (Bachelor of Science in Information Technology)
BSIT (Bachelor of Science in Industrial Technology)
BSCompE (Bachelor of Science in Computer Engineering)
BSAT (Bachelor of Science in Automotive Technology)
Associate in Electrical Engineering
Associate in Electronics Engineering
Associate in Communication Engineering

TESDA Accredited Programs
General Radio Communication Operator
Electronics Communication Technician
Marine Electrical
Marine Electronics
Automotive Technology
Digital Logic Computer Technician
Electronics Technology
Electrical Technology
Plant Mechanic Technology
Machine Shop Technology
Communication Secretarial Course
Refrigeration & Air Conditioning Technology
Business Machine Electronics Technician
Civil Technology
Automotive Mechanic Course
Diesel Mechanic Course
Practical Electricity Course
Electronic Serviceman in Television Receiver
Electronic Serviceman in Radio Receiver

Senior High School Department
Academic Track
Accountancy, Business and Management (ABM)
Humanities and Social Sciences (HUMSS)
Science, Technology, Engineering and Mathematics (STEM)
Technical Vocational and Livelihood (TVL) Track
Automotice Servicing – NC II
Consumer Electronics Servicing – NC II
Electrical Installation and Maintenance – NC II
Shielded Metal Arc Welding – NC II
Computer Systems Servicing – NC II
Computer Programming – NC II

CTS-CN Faculty
 Ret. Col. Erlinda G. Oliva – Dean
 Mrs. Armi E. Chua – RLE Coordinator
 Mrs. Pilar P. Fernandez – Academic Coordinator
 Mrs. Cherry P. Villaver – CHN Coordinator
 Mrs. Joni Michelle B. Abellana
 Ms. Jurbren M. Empleo
 Mr. Joel M. Cabucos

CTS-CN Affiliated Hospitals
 Cebu City Medical Center
 Vicente Sotto Memorial Medical Center
 Don Ignacio Cortes General Hospital
 Saint Anthony Mother and Child Hospital
 St. Vincent General Hospital

See also
University of Cebu

External links
 
Official Website

Vocational education in the Philippines
Educational institutions established in 1950
Universities and colleges in Cebu City
1950 establishments in the Philippines